Ust-Katav is a town in Chelyabinsk Oblast, Russia, located on the Yuryuzan River. Population:

Administrative and municipal status
Within the framework of administrative divisions, it is, together with ten rural localities, incorporated as the Town of Ust-Katav—an administrative unit with the status equal to that of the districts. As a municipal division, the Town of Ust-Katav is incorporated as Ust-Katavsky Urban Okrug.

Economy
Ust-Katav is best known for its factory UKVZ, which is the production place of the world's most numerous model of streetcar, the KTM-5.

Transportation
Ust-Katav is situated near the Trans-Siberian Railway, as well as the M5 "Ural" motorway.

References

Notes

Sources

Cities and towns in Chelyabinsk Oblast
Ufa Governorate
Naukograds
Monotowns in Russia